Kalorama, a Greek neologism signifying "beautiful view", may refer to:
Kalorama, Washington, D.C., a neighborhood near Dupont Circle
Kalorama Triangle Historic District, Washington, D.C.
Kalorama, Victoria, a suburb of Melbourne in Australia